Lily Malone may refer to:

Lily Malone, character in Baby (2000 film)
Dorothy Parker, inspiration for Lily Malone in Hotel Universe